Vorontsovo is a rural locality in Besedinsky Selsoviet Rural Settlement, Kursky District, Kursk Oblast, Russia. Population:

Geography 
The village is located on the Rat River (a right tributary of the Seym), 106 km from the Russia–Ukraine border, 15 km east of the district center – the town Kursk, 1 km from the selsoviet center – Besedino.

 Climate
Vorontsovo has a warm-summer humid continental climate (Dfb in the Köppen climate classification).

Transport 
Vorontsovo is located 1 km from the federal route  (Kursk – Voronezh –  "Kaspy" Highway; a part of the European route ), 7.5 km from the road of regional importance  (Kursk – Kastornoye), 8 km from the nearest railway station Otreshkovo (railway line Kursk – 146 km).

The rural locality is situated 15 km from Kursk Vostochny Airport, 118 km from Belgorod International Airport and 190 km from Voronezh Peter the Great Airport.

References

Notes

Sources

Rural localities in Kursky District, Kursk Oblast